Kurek is a Polish surname. Notable people with the surname include:
 Adrian Kurek (born 1988), Polish professional road bicycle race
 Anna Kurek, Polish volleyball player
 Bartosz Kurek (born 1988), Polish volleyball player
 Damien Kurek (born 1989/1990), Canadian politician
 Ewa Kurek (born 1951), Polish historian
 Harvey Kurek Ovshinsky (born 1948), American writer and media producer
 Jalu Kurek (1904–1983), Polish poet and prose writer
 Józef Kurek (1933-2015), Polish ice hockey player
 Ralph Kurek, American football player
 Eddie Kurek, American musician

See also 
 Kłonowiec-Kurek, a village in the administrative district of Gmina Skaryszew
 Kurek Svita Formation, a Mesozoic geologic formation
 Kuzeh Kanan

Polish-language surnames